Hypatopa io is a moth in the family Blastobasidae. It is found in Costa Rica.

The length of the forewings is 5.5–6.2 mm. The forewings are pale yellowish brown intermixed with brown scales near the middle. The hindwings are translucent pale brown.

Etymology
The specific name refers to Io, the daughter of Inachus.

References

Moths described in 2013
Hypatopa